The Nyanzaga mine is one of the largest gold mines in the Tanzania and in the world. The mine is located in the north-west of the country in Mwanza Region. The mine has estimated reserves of 4.2 million oz of gold.

References 

Gold mines in Tanzania
Buildings and structures in the Mwanza Region